Villamayor de Monjardín (very exceptionally in Basque: Deio) is a town and municipality located in the province and  the autonomous community of Navarre, northern Spain.

The ruins of the castle of San Esteban de Deyo sit on the hill above the town.

References

External links

 Ayuntamiento de Villamayor de Monjardín - Official website.  
 Villamayor de Monjardín data - Government of Navarra - information and data of local entities of Navarra.  
 VILLAMAYOR DE MONJARDÍN in the Bernardo Estornés Lasa - Auñamendi Encyclopedia (Euskomedia Fundazioa)  

Municipalities in Navarre